Shadow Warriors: The Covert War in Korea is  a non-fiction book written by William B. Breuer published by John Wiley & Sons in 1996. It describes various clandestine operations performed by the Allies/Western forces during the Korean War.

External links
 Library record

1996 non-fiction books
Korean War